Crystal Empire is the second full-length album by the German power metal band Freedom Call. It was released on 22 January 2001 by Steamhammer. It was the last Freedom Call album with Sascha Gerstner, who later joined Helloween.

Track list

Credits
Chris Bay – vocals, guitar, keyboards
Sascha Gerstner – guitar
Ilker Ersin – bass guitar
Dan Zimmermann – drums

Guests
Choirs: Rolf Kholer, Olaf Senkbeil, Janie Dixon, Mitch Schmitt
Bass guitar on tracks 4, 6, 7 and 9: Stefan Heimer

References 

2001 albums
Freedom Call albums
SPV/Steamhammer albums
Albums produced by Charlie Bauerfeind